The guitarra panzona, guitarra túa or guitarra blanca is a Mexican guitar with six strings and deep body. This guitar is sometimes substituted by a guitarron. It provides a tubby sounding rhythm for  calentano music, accompanying violin, guitar and tamborita.

References

External links 
 Photos
 All Things Strings

Guitars
Mexican musical instruments